Ross Cowan is a British historian and author specialising in Roman military history.

Education and career 

Cowan studied at the University of Glasgow, completing an MA in classical civilisation in 1997 and a PhD in history in 2003. His doctoral thesis was on the Praetorian Guard and Legio II Parthica, entitled Aspects of the Severan Field Army AD 193–238.

Since earning his PhD Cowan has been an independent scholar, writing books on Roman military history for Osprey Publishing, Greenhill Books and Pen & Sword Books.

Publications 

Books

 For the Glory of Rome: A History of Warriors and Warfare 
 Roman Conquests: Italy 
 Roman Battle Tactics 109 BC–AD 313 
 Roman Legionary 109-58 BC: The Age of Marius, Sulla and Pompey the Great 
 Roman Legionary 58 BC–AD 69 
 Roman Legionary AD 69-161 
 Imperial Roman Legionary AD 161-284 
 Roman Legionary AD 284-337: The Age of Diocletian and Constantine the Great
 Milvian Bridge AD 312: Constantine's Battle for Empire and Faith 
 Roman Guardsman 62 BC–AD 324 

Select Articles

Arms & armour and military organisation in pre-Roman Italy:
 
 The Art of the Etruscan Armourer
 An Important Italic Helmet Rediscovered
 The Samnite Pilum
 Gladius Gallicus
 Etruscan and Gallic Pila
 Tales of the Axe
 Weapons of the Early Legions
 Warlords and Warbands

Centurions

 Centurion
 Before Baculus: Some Sullan Centurions
 Lifeless He Fell: The Centurion in the Third and Fourth Centuries AD

Praetorian Guard

 Roman Adventurers
 Grim Guardians: Emperor Claudius and His Praetorians

Romans as Warriors

 Champions and Tradition: Single Combat in the Age of Belisarius
 Roman Warriors: The Myth of the Military Machine
 Head-Hunting Roman Cavalry

War Cries and Weapons Clashing

 The Clashing of Weapons and Silent Advances in Roman Battles

Later Roman Army

 Dreams and Visions in the Roman Military
 Old Weapons For New Soldiers
 Exploratores: Scouting for the Soldier Emperor

Various

 More Like Lions Than Men
 Despised and Idolized: The Lives of Roman Charioteers

References

External links
Academia.edu
https://about.me/rosscowan

Living people
Year of birth missing (living people)
British historians
Alumni of the University of Glasgow